The 2023 Hartford Athletic season is the club's fifth season of existence and their fifth in the USL Championship, the second tier of American soccer.

Hartford Athletic will also play in the U.S. Open Cup for the second time in club history.

Transfers

In

Squad

Schedule

USL Championship

U.S. Open Cup 

Hartford Athletic will enter in the second round of the U.S. Open Cup.

References 

Hartford Athletic